Francisco Contreras (January 21, 1877 – May 3, 1933) was a Chilean writer.

Chilean essayists
Chilean male writers
1877 births
1933 deaths